Stronger is the first compilation by Swedish alternative metal band Dead by April. It was released on 24 January 2011. The album features some b-sides, acoustic versions, remixes, cover songs as well as an unreleased demo version of the song "More Than Yesterday" as well as two unreleased re-recorded acoustic versions. This is the first release by the band to feature Zandro Santiago as lead vocalist.

Track listing

Song information
 Track 1, 2 and 3 are new mixed songs; originally from the UK single of Losing You.
 Track 4 and 5 are bonus tracks; from their debut album  Dead by April.
 Track 6 is a Killing Joke cover; from their single Love Like Blood/Promise Me.
 Track 7 is a remixed version of the song made by Shawn Crahan; from their single Angels of Clarity.
 Track 8 and 9 are studio recorded acoustic versions of the songs. Not to be confused with the studio recorded versions found on the Angels of Clarity single which featured the vocals of Pontus Hjelm and Jimmie Strimell instead of Zandro Santiago.
 Track 10 is a demo version of the song; the final version is included on their second album Incomparable

Personnel
Dead by April
 Jimmie Strimell – unclean and clean vocals
 Zandro Santiago - clean vocals (only on track 6, 8, 9 & 10)
 Marcus Wesslén – bass guitar
 Alexander Svenningson – drums

Additional musicians
 Pontus Hjelm - guitars, keyboards, programming, backing vocals
 Johan Olsson - guitars 
 Shawn 'Clown' Crahan (of Slipknot) - composition of track 7

References

Dead by April albums
2011 remix albums